Víctor Manuel Gaviria González (born January 19, 1955, in Liborina, Antioquia, Colombia) is a Colombian film director, writer, and poet. His four feature-length films are acclaimed and have won many international awards. He is the first Colombian filmmaker to be featured at the Cannes Film Festival. He is often recognized as Colombia's most influential and well-known filmmaker.

Early life

He was born in the town of Liborina and raised in Medellin, Colombia, the sixth of 8 siblings. He grew up during the beginning of the Colombian conflict; an ongoing civil war between the Colombian government and extremist groups and drug cartels, which led to immense violence and unrest throughout Medellin. He attended the University of Antioquia and earned a degree in psychology. Gaviria took interest in poetry, writing seven poetry books that won several awards.

He studied psychology at Antioquia University, but quit to pursue his film-making career. He joined several art collectives and met Catholic priest Luis Alberto Álvarez, who became a close friend and an important figure in his development.

Career 
He is known for his raw style in portraying social issues and exclusion. His method has influenced Colombian and Latin American cinema; presenting actors with no acting background, but who are natural storytellers and are actively involved in the development of the film.

Films

Awards 
Rodrigo D: No Future, 1990 (official selection at the 1990 Cannes Film Festival)
 La vendedora de rosas, 1998 (official selection at the 1998 Cannes Film Festival)
 Sumas y restas, 2004
 The Animal's Wife, 2016

Books

References

External links
 

1955 births
Living people
Colombian film directors
People from Medellín